Alecsandro Aparecido dos Santos (born 27 September 1984), or simply Nino Santos, is a Brazilian professional footballer, who plays as defender.

Nino Santos began his career at the base of Rio Preto where he signed his first professional contract, working in two Championships Paulistas's Access Division and Cup Paulista. After this had a quick passage through Ulbra to reach the Catanduvense, time of his hometown, to compete in the Paulista Championship Series A2.
After a major championship, becoming one of the leaders and pillars of the team that reached the final stage of the competition, now in the Championship of the First Division at Guaratinguetá team. After the competition, he returned to Catanduvense idol. Again in Catanduvense stood out and landed in Criciúma, team led by the young coach Argel Fucks, which achieved the desired access to the Serie B of the Brazilian Championship.
In Grêmio Barueri came to compete in the Championship of the First Division, but good performances earned her proposal and on one of those landed in Al-Jahra, Kuwait team, where he remained for five seasons, reaching a staggering 169 games and 42 goals, becoming the team captain and star of his team.
In Al-Jahra, even without title achievements were vice champions of the King's Cup, Nino became idol, but after five seasons was transferred to Al-Batin Saudi Arabia for the season 2016-2017, later moved back to Kuwait to Al-Arabi SC in January 2017.

External links 
 
 
 

1984 births
People from Catanduva
Living people
Brazilian footballers
Al Batin FC players
Brazilian expatriate footballers
Expatriate footballers in Kuwait
Expatriate footballers in Saudi Arabia
Brazilian expatriate sportspeople in Saudi Arabia
Saudi Professional League players
Al-Arabi SC (Kuwait) players
Association football forwards
Brazilian expatriate sportspeople in Kuwait
Al Jahra SC players
Kuwait Premier League players
Grêmio Barueri Futebol players
Criciúma Esporte Clube players
Grêmio Catanduvense de Futebol players
Campinense Clube players
Canoas Sport Club players
Rio Preto Esporte Clube players
Clube Atlético Penapolense players
Footballers from São Paulo (state)